"The Heart from Your Hate" is a song by American metal band Trivium, appearing on the band's eighth studio album The Sin and the Sentence. The song premiered on Octane on August 23, 2017. The following day, August 24, the song was released as the second advanced single from the album.

Music video
A music video was released for the song on the same day as the single's release. The video shows the band performing the song with a red filter over the video. The music video was directed by Jon Paul Douglass.

Track listing

Charts

Personnel
Matt Heafy – lead vocals, rhythm guitar
Corey Beaulieu – lead guitar
Paolo Gregoletto – bass guitar, backing vocals
Alex Bent – drums

References

External links
Official Music Video on YouTube

2017 songs
2017 singles
Trivium (band) songs
Roadrunner Records singles
Songs written by Matt Heafy
Songs written by Corey Beaulieu
Songs written by Paolo Gregoletto